The Loose Box was a restaurant in Mundaring, an outer eastern suburb of Perth, Western Australia.  During its 34-year existence, it won many awards for its classical French cuisine and service, and had a big impact on the hospitality industry in Perth.

At the time of its closure, the restaurant held a two star rating by The West Australian Good Food Guide 2013.  Alongside it was a complex of six cottages providing bed and breakfast accommodation to diners who wanted to stay the night.

See also

French cuisine
Western Australian wine
Perth Hills

References

Notes

Bibliography

External links
Joie de Vivre: The Loose Box @ Mundaring – review of the restaurant
Table on 48: The Loose Box – Perth (lots of ducks and i’m not just talking confit) – review of the restaurant
VisitVineyards.com: Degustation by Alain Fabregues – review of the book by Robyn Lewis
Weekend Notes: The Loose Box Restaurant – review of the restaurant by Douglas Sutherland-Bruce
Who are you? Alain Fabregues – 720 ABC Perth interview of the chef, Alain Fabrègues

1979 establishments in Australia
2013 disestablishments in Australia
Defunct restaurants in Australia
French restaurants
French-Australian culture
Mundaring, Western Australia
Restaurants disestablished in 2013
Restaurants established in 1979
Restaurants in Perth, Western Australia
European restaurants in Australia